Mordecai Jonah Rosenfeld (21 October 1797 – 5 June 1885), also known by the acronym Mishuv (short for , "Mordecai Jonah the Shoḥet and Bodek") was a Galician religious leader and Hebrew writer.

Biography
Born in Dynów, he moved to Przemyśl at the age of seven and then Brody, where he studied the Talmud, Hebrew and German. Among his teachers was Tzvi Elimelech Spira, the first Dinover Rebbe. In about 1830 he became shoḥet at Sośnica, and remained there for the rest of his life.

Rosenfeld's philosophy was influenced by the work of Nachman Krochmal. He was the author of En boḥen (Przemyśl, 1872), a commentary on Beḥinat olam; Or karov (Przemyśl, 1873), a commentary on Or ha-ḥayyim by Joseph Yabez, with an appendix on the origin of Kabbalah; and an edition of the Book of Job with commentary (Kenaf renanim) and philological notes (Hokhaḥ milim; Lemberg, 1875). The most important of these was Netinah la-kohen, strictures on Netinah la-ger by Nathan Marcus Adler.

Bibliography

References
 

1797 births
1885 deaths
19th-century Jewish biblical scholars
Bible commentators
Hebrew-language writers
Jewish linguists
People of the Haskalah
People from Dynów
People from Przemyśl
Philosophers of Judaism